Bogheid is a historic mansion in Glen Cove, New York.

History
It was built in 1938 for Helen Porter Pryibil, daughter of William H. Porter.  It was designed by Delano and Aldrich in the French Manor style.

At some point Prybil sold the estate to the City of Glen Cove.  The surrounding estate was converted into a municipal golf course, with Prybil retaining the right to live in the house until her death in 1969. The city then sold the house to Arthur Young Associates, which returned it after a few years.

In 1981 it was sold to Martin T. Carey, brother of New York Governor Hugh Carey, who renamed it Cashelmara.  In 1985 it was the site of the Designers' Showcase event for interior decorators. However, it afterwards became vacant and was left in disrepair.  The Society for the Preservation of Long Island Antiquities placed it on their list of endangered historic properties in 2010.

References

External links 
 Photographs from Old Long Island

Glen Cove, New York
Mansions of Gold Coast, Long Island